Garra palaruvica is a species of cyprinid fish in the genus Garra which is found in the Kallada River basin, Kerala, India.

References 

Garra
Fish described in 2013